Cynanchum hooperianum is an Asian species of liana in the family Apocynaceae.  Its known distribution includes:  Guangxi, Indochina, Java and Sulawesi.  In Vietnam it grows in the south of the country and may be called trâm hùng.  Before 2016, it had been placed in the genera Oxystelma and Raphistemma.

References

External links
 

Indochina
hooperianum